Jan Michał Rozwadowski (7 December 1867 – 13 March 1935) was a Polish linguist and a professor at the Jagiellonian University. He was also the president of the Polish Academy of Learning.

References

1867 births
1935 deaths
Burials at Rakowicki Cemetery
Linguists from Poland
Polish scientists
Academic staff of Jagiellonian University
Members of the Polish Academy of Learning
Members of the Lwów Scientific Society
Polish Austro-Hungarians
People from the Kingdom of Galicia and Lodomeria
People from Dębica County